The 1975 Davis Cup was the 64th edition of the Davis Cup, the most important tournament between national teams in men's tennis. 55 teams would enter the competition, 32 in the Europe Zone, 12 in the Americas Zone, and 11 in the Eastern Zone. Kenya made its first appearance in the tournament.

Chile defeated South Africa in the Americas Inter-Zonal final, Australia defeated New Zealand in the Eastern Zone final, and Sweden and Czechoslovakia were the winners of the two Europe Zones, defeating Spain and France respectively.

In the Inter-Zonal Zone, Czechoslovakia defeated Australia and Sweden defeated Chile in the semifinals. Sweden then defeated Czechoslovakia in the final to win their first title and become the sixth nation to win the Davis Cup. The final was held at the Kungliga tennishallen in Stockholm, Sweden on 19–21 December.

Americas Zone

North & Central America Zone

Preliminary rounds

Main Draw

South America Zone

Preliminary rounds

Main Draw

Americas Inter-Zonal Final
Chile vs. South Africa

Eastern Zone

Final
New Zealand vs. Australia

Europe Zone

Zone A

Pre-qualifying round

Preliminary rounds

Main Draw

Final
Spain vs. Sweden

Zone B

Pre-qualifying round

Preliminary rounds

Main Draw

Final
Czechoslovakia vs. France

Inter-Zonal Zone

Draw

Semifinals
Sweden vs. Chile

Czechoslovakia vs. Australia

Final
Sweden vs. Czechoslovakia

Controversy
The Inter-Zonal Zone semifinal between Sweden and Chile was played on 19–21 September in Båstad, Sweden, two years after Augusto Pinochet's military coup in Chile. Many people in Sweden wanted the match to be cancelled, in protest of the junta's violations of human rights, however others wanted sport and politics to remain separated.

Chilekommittén mobilised protests against the match. The call for the manifestation was issued on July 30, 1975. The slogan of the protests was Stoppa matchen! ('Stop the match'). About 7,000 people took part in the protest. Hundreds of balloons, with names of political prisoners were released in the vicinity of the match venue, guarded by a police force of 1,300. Through Chilean sports commentators on site, news about the protests reached Chile. A special issue of Chilebulletinen was produced for the protests, with 20,000 copies.

The then governing Swedish Social Democratic Party didn't take part in the protests on September 20. A protest march was instead organized in Båstad by the Swedish Social Democratic Youth League on September 18, ending at the town square, where former prime minister Tage Erlander and Sweden's former ambassador to Chile Harald Edelstam (who personally helped rescue over 1,200 political prisoners in Chile after the 1973 coup) addressed a crowd of some 3,000.

Olof Palme's government tried to stop the match, but on September 12 negotiations ended with a decision to play. During the game on September 20, which was guarded by 1,300 police, over 7,000 demonstrators gathered peacefully on the square. The match was played behind closed doors with no spectators present.

See also
 1975 Nations Cup

References

External links
Davis Cup Official Website
Davis Cup at SVT's open archive (including the 1975 tournament) 

 
Davis Cups by year
Davis Cup
Davis Cup
Davis Cup
Davis Cup
Davis Cup
Davis Cup